is a Japanese actress and model who is affiliated with Ever Green Entertainment.

Biography
In April 2006, Sakata won the Grand Prix at the exclusive model audition for the fashion magazine, Love Berry, the same year on June 1, she became an exclusive model in its July issue. She appeared in many commercials, dramas, and theater plays. In April 2009, Sakata went to a Tokyo high school. Along with it, she moved to Tokyo. Although her desire for Tokyo was from her sophomore high school, there was also opposition from her things, family, and staff Sakata was not solidified, and that could not be moved to Tokyo for junior high school. She graduated from Love Berry on its June 2010 issue, the same year in July, she was a model for Seventeen. In March 2012, Sakata graduated from high school. In April 2013, she graduated from Seventeen. The same year in May, she was an exclusive model for CanCam.

Filmography

TV series

Films

References

External links
  

Japanese female models
21st-century Japanese actresses
1993 births
Living people
Actors from Saga Prefecture
Models from Saga Prefecture